Akoustik Piano is a virtual instrument developed by Native Instruments for both the Mac OS X and Windows XP platforms. It uses a large collection of audio samples taken from three grand pianos.

The software used for playback is Native Instruments' own Kontakt Player (a feature-limited version of Kontakt), which is used as a stand-alone program for live performance or recording to MIDI. Additionally it may be used as a plug-in for a digital audio workstation (such as MOTU's Digital Performer.)

Sampled instruments 
The pianos sampled include Steinway concert grand piano model D, Imperial Bösendorfer (grand piano 290), Bechstein D 280 and the upright piano Steingraeber 130. The audio library comes in both 16-bit and 24-bit resolutions.

Playback adjustments 
The Kontakt synthesizer includes several optional transformations to the sample's sound. Pitch level, pitch bend, velocity curve, tuning system (including quarter-tone), dynamics, microphone distance, equalizer, lid position (closed, half-, or full-stick) as well as choice of performance space may all be modified.

Supported technology 
Virtual Studio Technology (VST), Audio Units, RTAS, DXi, Audio Stream Input/Output (ASIO), Apple Computer's Core Audio and Microsoft's DirectSound are all supported. Akoustic Piano is now a Macintosh Universal Binary.

Native Instruments
Keyboard software synthesizers